Grizz, Griz or Gryz may refer to:

Entertainment

Fictional characters
 Grizz (We Bare Bears),  grizzly bear cartoon character
 Grizz Griswold, character in the 30 Rock TV series
 Gryz Pyke, character in Phantasy Star IV: The End of the Millennium
 Grizz (Gareth) Visser, character in The Society (TV series)

Music
 GRiZ (born 1990), US-based electronic artist
 Grizz (Harkonen EP), 2001 EP

Television
 Grizz Chapman (born 1974), American TV actor

Other uses
 Alex "Grizz" Wyllie (born 1944), New Zealand rugby player and coach
 Grits, in the former Yugoslavia grits are known as griz
 Grizz, the mascot for the Oakland University Golden Grizzlies
 Grizz (mascot), the mascot for the Memphis Grizzlies basketball team
 Memphis Grizzlies, a National Basketball Association team in Memphis, Tennessee
 Montana Grizzlies, University of Montana college sports teams
 GRYZ, Yitzchak Zev Soloveitchik, a rabbi
 Griz Nez, cape in Northern France

See also
Grizzly (disambiguation)